North Korea national amateur boxing athletes represents Democratic People's Republic of Korea or North Korea in regional, continental and world matches and tournaments sanctioned by the Amateur International Boxing Association (AIBA).

Olympics

2004 Athens Olympics

Two boxers represented North Korea in this edition of the Olympiad. Featherweight Kim Song Guk won a silver medal.

Entry list
 Kwak Hyok-Ju (Light Flyweight)
 Kim Song-Guk (Featherweight) - Silver

Asian Games

2006 Doha Asian Games

Four boxers represented North Korea in this edition of the Asiad. Ranked 11th with one bronze medal in a four-way tie with Japan, Syria and the host country Qatar.

Entry list
 Kim Song-Guk Featherweight - Bronze
 Kim Won Guk (Bantamweight)
 Kwak Hyok Ju (Flyweight)
 Ro Sok (Light Flyweight)

References

External links
Boxing Association of DPR of Korea at International Boxing Association

Amateur boxing
Boxing in North Korea